"Hello,' Said the Stick" is a science fiction short story  by American writer Michael Swanwick, published in 2002.  It was nominated for the 2003 Hugo Award for Best Short Story as well as the 2003 Locus Award.

Plot summary
Set in a distant future where the Earth's ex-colonies have turned the planet into a steampunkish, pseudo-medieval wasteland in order to stop their technological advancement, particularly in weapons, the story follows a foot soldier who is going to join the Iron Duke's army to help him in his siege at Port Morningstar, a town held by the despotic Council of Seven. Along the way he finds a talking stick which convinces him to take it with him.

Author's comments
In a 2017 interview, Swanwick said: "I came up with the idea for Hello,' Said the Stick" while listening to a friend's reading on a Friday night, started writing it the next morning after breakfast, and got it into the mail at 2:30 that afternoon. No diagrams, no outlines, no sweat. And it placed on the Hugo ballot too! If every story came that easily, I'd be a very happy man."

References

External links 
 

2002 short stories
Short stories by Michael Swanwick
Works originally published in Analog Science Fiction and Fact
2000s science fiction works